Sandy Baron (born Sanford Irving Beresofsky; May 5, 1936 – January 21, 2001) was an American actor and comedian who performed on stage, in films, and on television.

Early life
Sanford Beresofsky was born in Brooklyn, New York, and grew up in the Brownsville neighborhood, the son of Helen Farberman, a waitress, and Max Beresofsky, a house painter, both Yiddish-speaking Russian Jewish immigrants. His father was born in Slonim, Belarus. He graduated from Thomas Jefferson High School in East New York; and while he was a student at Brooklyn College, to which he received a scholarship, he changed his name to "Sandy Baron"—taking his inspiration from the nearby Barron's Bookstore. He began his career working in the Catskill Mountains resorts with their "Borscht Belt" brand of Jewish humor, on which Baron made his mark. He then moved on to the Compass Players Improv Comedy group in the late 1950s.

Career
Baron made his Broadway debut in Tchin-Tchin in 1962. He also appeared in many other Broadway plays, hits as well as flops, including Autoro Ui, Generations, and Lenny (Los Angeles production). He replaced Cliff Gorman in the lead role of Lenny Bruce on Broadway.

In 1964, he established a reputation as part of the weekly television program That Was The Week That Was, and as the opening act for Steve Lawrence and Eydie Gorme at the Copacabana in New York City. In the 1966–1967 season, Baron co-starred with Will Hutchins in the NBC sitcom Hey, Landlord, about a brownstone apartment in Manhattan. In the 1970s, he made regular appearances on talk shows such as The Mike Douglas Show and The Merv Griffin Show, and multiple guest appearances on The Tonight Show Starring Johnny Carson.  Sandy was also co-host of The Della Reese Show and hosted a number of television talk shows including A.M. New York and Mid-Morning LA. In addition, he was the host of the pilot for Hollywood Squares and often appeared as a celebrity contestant on this and other games shows.

He acted in many television programs, including a recurring role in Seinfeld as Jack Klompus, with the episode "The Pen" featuring dialogue between Baron's character and Jerry that, as a critic wrote, "[was] one of many reasons Seinfeld has been compared to the plays of Samuel Beckett." He starred in Law & Order and took the role of Grandpa in a 1996 TV-movie revival of The Munsters, titled The Munsters' Scary Little Christmas. His appearances in feature films included Sweet November (1968), Targets (1968), If It's Tuesday, This Must Be Belgium (1969), The Out-of-Towners (1970), and Birdy (1984). Along with several of his contemporaries, Baron played himself in Woody Allen's Broadway Danny Rose (1984), and narrated the film.

Baron also wrote music, starting out in 1961 in the Brill Building in New York City with songs such as "Flying Blue Angels" and Adam Wade's "The Writing on The Wall." In 1971 he co-wrote Lou Rawls' hit "A Natural Man" with Bobby Hebb ("Sunny"). Sandy wrote and recorded a number of comedy albums, including The Race Race and God Save the Queens co-written with Reverend James R. McGraw, editor/writer of Dick Gregory's books.

Throughout his career, he opened for Neil Diamond, Frank Sinatra, The Fifth Dimension, Bobby Vinton, Anthony Newley and Diana Ross among others.

Personal life and death
He was married to model/actress Geraldine Baron, writer/activist Mary Jo Webster Baron, and writer/screenwriter Stephanie Ericsson; all ending in divorce. He had no children. Baron died on January 21, 2001, of emphysema in Van Nuys, California, at the age of 64.

Television

Filmography

References

External links
 
 
 

1936 births
2001 deaths
American male film actors
American male stage actors
American male television actors
Jewish American male actors
American male comedians
Respiratory disease deaths in California
Deaths from emphysema
Male actors from New York City
People from Brownsville, Brooklyn
Burials at Hillside Memorial Park Cemetery
Comedians from New York City
Thomas Jefferson High School (Brooklyn) alumni
Brooklyn College alumni
20th-century American comedians
20th-century American male actors
American people of Belarusian-Jewish descent
American people of Russian-Jewish descent
20th-century American Jews
American Ashkenazi Jews